Pennsylvania State Senate District 16 includes parts of Bucks County and Lehigh County. It is currently represented by Republican Jarrett Coleman.

District profile
The district includes the following areas:

Bucks County

 Bedminster Township
 Bridgeton Township
 Dublin
 Durham Township
 East Rockhill Township
 Haycock Township
 Hilltown Township
 Milford Township
 Nockamixon Township
 Perkasie
 Quakertown
 Richland Township
 Richlandtown
 Riegelsville
 Sellersville
 Silverdale
 Springfield Township
 Telford (Bucks County portion)
 Tinicum Township
 Trumbauersville
 West Rockhill Township

Lehigh County

 Alburtis
 Allentown (PART, Wards 13 and 18)
 Coopersburg
 Heidelberg Township
 Lower Macungie Township
 Lower Milford Township
 Lowhill Township
 Lynn Township
 Macungie
 North Whitehall Township
 Slatington
 South Whitehall Township (PART, Districts 03, 06 and 08)
 Upper Macungie Township
 Upper Milford Township
 Upper Saucon Township
 Washington Township
 Weisenberg Township

Senators

Recent election results

References

Pennsylvania Senate districts
Government of Lehigh County, Pennsylvania